Liberal Union is a name used by several political parties in different countries including the following.

Existing parties:

 Albania - Liberal Union Party
 Cuba - Cuban Liberal Union

Historical parties:

 Australia - Liberal Union (South Australia) (1910–22)
 Australia - Australian Liberal Union (1911–15), organisational wing of the Liberal Party (Australia, 1909)
 Australia - Liberal Party (1922), also known as Liberal Union Party
 Finland - Liberal League (Finland) (1951–65)
 Germany - Liberal Union (Germany) (1880–84)
 Italy – Liberal Union (Italy) (1913–22)
 Lithuania - Liberal Union of Lithuania (1990–2003), Liberal and Centre Union (2003–14)
 Netherlands - Liberal Union (Netherlands) (1885–1921)
 Ottoman Empire - Liberal Union (Ottoman Empire) (1909)
 Spain - Liberal Union (Spain) (1858–74)
 Spain - Liberal Union (Spain, 1983) (1983–84)

See also
Liberalism by country